The 2019–20 Egypt Cup qualifying rounds open the 88th season of the competition in Egypt, the oldest association football single knockout competition in Africa.

Calendar
The calendar for the 2019–20 Egypt Cup qualifying rounds, as announced by the Egyptian Football Association.

First Preliminary Round
The First Preliminary Round fixtures were played from 15 to 17 October 2019. A total of 205 teams from the Egyptian Third Division and the Egyptian Fourth Division entered at this stage of the competition. Like the previous season, a large number of clubs did not enter the competition due to financial status and other different reasons. The results were as follows:

The following team received a bye for this round:

El Horreya

Second Preliminary Round
The Second Preliminary Round fixtures were played on 19 and 20 October 2019. The results were as follows:

The following teams received a bye for this round:

MS Abou El Matamer
MS El Qabari
Al Jazeera
Al Wasta

Third Preliminary Round
The Third Preliminary Round fixtures were played from 25 to 28 October 2019. A total of 35 teams from the Egyptian Second Division entered at this stage of the competition. Muslim Youths (Qena) was the only team from the Second Division that did not enter the competition. The results were as follows:

Fourth Preliminary Round
The Fourth Preliminary Round fixtures were played from 13 to 16 November 2019. The results were as follows:

The following teams received a bye for this round:

Abou Qir Fertilizers
Al Aluminium
Biyala
Al Jazeera
MS Snouras
Nogoom
Olympic Club
El Qawmi
Qena
El Qouseiya
El Sharkia
Sporting Alexandria
Suez

Fifth Preliminary Round
The Fifth Preliminary Round fixtures were played from 20 to 23 November 2019. The results were as follows:

Competition proper

Winners from the Fifth Preliminary Round will advance to the Round of 32, where teams from the Egyptian Premier League will enter the competition.

Notes

References

qualifying rounds
Egypt Cup qualifying rounds